Bali (Baali, Kibali, Libaali) is a Bantu language spoken in the Bafwasende Territory of the Democratic Republic of the Congo. It has been included in Boan and seems to be most closely related to Lika.

References

Boan languages